Rok Nemanič (born December 28, 2001) is a Slovenian professional basketball player. He is a 1.95m tall guard.

Professional career
Nemanič started playing professional basketball for Koper Primorska. 

In December 2020, He signed a multi-year contract with Šentjur.

References

External links
 Eurobasket.com profile
 REALGM profile
 PROBALLERS profile

2001 births
Living people
ABA League players
Shooting guards
Point guards
Slovenian men's basketball players